John Walter Budd (January 14, 1899 – December 26, 1963) was a professional football player from Newton, New Jersey. He was an 
offensive tackle and guard and also served as a kicker. Budd played college football for Lafayette College before making his National Football League debut in 1926 with the Frankford Yellow Jackets. After helping the Yellow Jackets win the 1926 NFL Championship, he later joined the Pottsville Maroons for the 1927 and 1928 seasons. Budd was a first-team All-Pro in 1926.

Notes

External links

1899 births
1963 deaths
Players of American football from New Jersey
Frankford Yellow Jackets players
Pottsville Maroons players
Lafayette Leopards football players
People from Newton, New Jersey
Sportspeople from Sussex County, New Jersey
Burials in Pennsylvania